Cota is a genus of pygmy grasshoppers in the family Tetrigidae. There are at least three described species in Cota.

Species
These three species belong to the genus Cota:
 Cota bispina (Saussure, 1861)
 Cota saxosa Bolívar, 1887
 Cota strumosa Bolívar, 1887

References

Further reading

 

Tetrigidae